Radomir may refer to:

People
 Radomir (given name), a Slavic male given name
 Gavril Radomir of Bulgaria (died 1015), Tsar of Bulgaria

Places
 , a village in Cetinje Municipality, Montenegro
 Radomir (mountain), a mountain peak on the Bulgarian/Greek border
 Radomir (town), a town in Pernik Province, Bulgaria
 Radomir Municipality, a municipality in Pernik Province, Bulgaria
 Radomir, a village in Dioști Commune, Dolj County, Romania